The Hobart City Hall in Hobart, Oklahoma, at Main and 3rd Sts., also known as Old City Hall, was built in 1912.  It was listed on the National Register of Historic Places in 1978.

It was designed by W.A. Etherton of Stillwater, Oklahoma and was built by contractors Nix & Creasey of Hobart, Oklahoma.

It is a three-story building,  in plan, which included a 1,100-seat auditorium.

References

City halls in Oklahoma
National Register of Historic Places in Kiowa County, Oklahoma
Buildings and structures completed in 1912